Stuart Jones (born 14 March 1984) is a Welsh football coach and former footballer who played as a defender. He was most recently a coach at Cymru Premier club Aberystwyth Town.

Career
A product of the Swansea City youth development system, Jones made his first-team debut on 22 October 2002 in a 2–1 defeat to Stevenage Borough in the Football League Trophy. He made over 30 appearances for the Swans between 2003 and 2005 but moved on at the end of the 2004–05 season. In 2005, he joined Llanelli, becoming the club's first full-time player since the Jock Stein era in the 1950s. At Llanelli, Jones was voted into the Welsh Premier team of the season for the 2007–8, 2008–9 seasons, 2010–11, 2011–12.

Over the next 7 years, Jones made almost 200 appearances for the side and in that time at the club won the League, League Cup and Welsh Cup and qualified for the UEFA Europa League on several occasions. He has also earned caps for both the Wales Under 21s and the Welsh Semi Pro squads, and has been named in the Welsh Premier Team of the Year on no less than 4 occasions. Jones joined Aberystwyth Town in 2012. Stuart was a rock in the Centre of Defence in the 2014/15 as the Black and Greens managed an excellent fourth-placed finish. He received six nominations from rival Managers for last year's WPL Team of the Season. Based in Borth, Jones signed for his local Welsh Premier League club in May 2012, and took on the role of Club Development Officer alongside his playing duties. Since joining Aber in 2012, he has made over 100 appearances in Black and Green, scoring 10+ times, including a vital header at TNS towards the end of the season. Overall, he has made over 300 WPL appearances, scoring 20+ goals. It is telling, and quite remarkable that none of these appearances have been as a substitute.

On 4 August 2019, Jones returned to hometown club Aberystwyth Town.

Career statistics

Honours
Bala Town

Welsh Cup winner: 2017

Individual
 Welsh Premier League Team of the Year: 2007–08, 2008–09, 2010–11, 2011–12, 2013–14

References

External links

Welsh Premier profile

Living people
1984 births
Footballers from Aberystwyth
Welsh footballers
Wales youth international footballers
Wales under-21 international footballers
Wales semi-pro international footballers
Swansea City A.F.C. players
Llanelli Town A.F.C. players
English Football League players
Cymru Premier players
Aberystwyth Town F.C. players
Bala Town F.C. players
Association football defenders